Tanimura (written: 谷村) is a Japanese surname. Notable people with the surname include:

 Aya Tanimura, Australian writer and director
 George Tanimura, (born 1915), Japanese-American agriculture leader
 Isao Tanimura, Japanese mixed martial artist
 Mitsuki Tanimura (born 1990), Japanese actress
 Nana Tanimura (born 1987), Japanese pop singer
 Tanimura Shinji (born 1948), Japanese singer-songwriter
 Yoshitaka Tanimura, Japanese mathematical physicist

References

Japanese-language surnames